Robertson Howard (1847–1899) was a doctor and attorney who is best known as one of the six co-founders of Pi Kappa Alpha Fraternity.

Early life

Howard was born December 11, 1847 to Flodoardo R. Howard and Lydia Maria (Robertson) Howard, in Brookeville, Maryland. His mother was a descendant of Quakers, and his father's family had ancestral ties to the Howard family of England, including the likes of Catherine Howard. When Howard was three his father moved the family to Washington, DC, where he purchased a plot of land directly across from Ford's Theatre and established a medical office. Today the site is occupied by Washington's largest department store. Although his father was tied to the Howard family of England, his relations with the mainland quickly deteriorated.

As a child he attended Brookeville Academy, an institution founded in 1808 by his ancestors.

Professional life

Medicine

During the Civil War, Robertson, being a Quaker, refused to join either side. He graduated from Georgetown University, founded by his father, with his doctorate of medicine in 1865. However, being only eighteen years old, he was considered too young to begin his practice. Therefore, Howard was sent to the University of Virginia, where one of his uncles was currently employed, to obtain a post-graduate degree in chemistry.

While there he shared Room 47, West Range with James Benjamin Sclater Jr., with whom he and four other men founded Pi Kappa Alpha Fraternity on March 1, 1868. This would become one of the first fraternities in the United States. Howard would remain close friends with these men for the rest of his life- it is said that Howard kept autographed photographs of his fellow co-Founders in his possession throughout his lifetime.

After completing his post-graduate work at the University of Virginia, Howard was for two years a member of the medical faculty of Georgetown University, where he received an honorary Master of Arts. After leaving Georgetown, he worked for some time in the medical department of the National Museum, now the Arts and Industries Building of the Smithsonian Institution.

Law

After losing interest in medicine, Howard returned to Georgetown University to receive a Bachelor of Law degree in 1874. He moved to Baltimore and practiced law there for five years, during which time he married Isoline Maria Carusi on June 8, 1875. The couple would go on to have four sons and a daughter.

As a lawyer he handled western land claims, one of which led him to moving his family to St. Paul, Minnesota in 1881. During a span of approximately twenty years, Howard went into business partnership with Jude Kerr and ex-governor William Rainey Marshall He also twice held the position of editor of the West Publishing Company, a business that created law publications, a few of which he wrote himself.

Death

Howard died suddenly at age 52 on December 1, 1899. His body was taken back to Washington, D.C. for burial in the Congressional Cemetery. His grave was unmarked for years  until his Pi Kappa Alpha fraternity furnished a bronze plaque in his memory.

References

External links
 Pi Kappa Alpha site

1847 births
1899 deaths
Georgetown University School of Medicine alumni
Burials at the Congressional Cemetery
University of Virginia alumni
Pi Kappa Alpha founders